Markle House and Mill Site is a historic home and site of Markle's Mill located in Otter Creek Township, Vigo County, Indiana. The house was built in 1848, and is a two-story, Greek Revival style painted brick dwelling with Italianate style influences.  It has a one-story, front porch with Doric order columns.  The Markle's Mill burned in 1938, and the remains consist of stone and concrete foundations and the associated remains of the dam.  Also on the property are the contributing outhouse and carriage house.

It was listed on the National Register of Historic Places in 1979.

References

Houses on the National Register of Historic Places in Indiana
Archaeological sites on the National Register of Historic Places in Indiana
Greek Revival houses in Indiana
Houses completed in 1848
Buildings and structures in Vigo County, Indiana
National Register of Historic Places in Terre Haute, Indiana